Vivian Brown is the name of

 Vivian Brown (1927–2013), celebrity icon of San Francisco with her identical twin Marian; see Marian and Vivian Brown
 Vivian Brown (athlete) (1941–1998), American sprinter
 Vivian Brown (meteorologist), American television meteorologist